Scolus may refer to:
Scolus (Boeotia), a town of ancient Boeotia
Scolus (Chalcidice), a town of ancient Chalcidice